This is a list of female fitness and figure competitors.

A
 Jelena Abbou

B
 Lauren Beckham 
 Alexandra Béres 
 Sharon Bruneau

C
 Natalie Montgomery-Carroll
 Jen Cassetty
 Kim Chizevsky
 Susie Curry

D
 Debbie Dobbins
 Nicole Duncan

E
 Jamie Eason
 Alexis Ellis

F
 Amy Fadhli 
 Jaime Franklin

G
 Adela García 
 Connie Garner
 Elaine Goodlad
 Tracey Greenwood
 Oksana Grishina

H
 Mallory Haldeman
 Vanda Hădărean
 Jen Hendershott
 Soleivi Hernandez
 April Hunter

I

J
 Tsianina Joelson

K
 Adria Montgomery-Klein
 Ashley Kaltwasser

L
 Lauren Lillo
 Mary Elizabeth Lado
 Tammie Leady
 Jennifer Nicole Lee
 Amber Littlejohn
 Julie Lohre
 Jenny Lynn

M
 Timea Majorová
 Linda Maxwell
 Davana Medina
 Jodi Leigh Miller
Chisato Mishima

N
 Kim Nielsen

O

P
 Vicky Pratt
 Elena Panova
 Christine Pomponio-Pate
 Cathy Priest

Q

R
 Maite Richert
 Charlene Rink
 Kelly Ryan

S
 Erin Stern
 Carol Semple-Marzetta
 Krisztina Sereny
 Trish Stratus (Patricia Anne Stratigias)

T
 Kristi Tauti
 Jennifer Thomas

U

V
 Lisa Marie Varon

W
 Latisha Wilder
 Torrie Wilson
 Lyen Wong
 Jenny Worth
 Nicole Wilkins

Y

Z
 Marietta Žigalová
 Malika Zitouni

See also
List of female bodybuilders

References
There has been a rise in the number of women wanting to compete as fitness models. Females embraced the weight-lifting culture that was once dominated by men. In fact, now there are female-fitness-models, whom most girls look up to.

 
Sport-related lists
Fitness and figure competitors
Incomplete sports lists
Incomplete sports result lists